Hector Rail is a Swedish-based independent train haulage provider operating in the European rail transport market, operating 50 locomotives. The company provides locomotives and drivers to freight customers who need to have whole unit trains hauled between two places with a regular timetable.

From start, the majority of the shareholders were the Høegh family from Norway, through Höegh Capital Partners. In September 2014, the company was sold to EQT Infrastructure II.

History
Hector Rail ran its first train on 12 December 2004, and now operates around 5 million train-km a year in Sweden and Norway. It began operating in Denmark and running trains from Sweden to Germany during January 2008. In 2009 Hector rail started to haul a passenger train, for Veolia. During 2016 Hector Rail took ownership of GB Railfreight after GBRF was purchased by EQT Partners. Between 2016-2019 Hector Rail operated Blå Tåget between Gothenburg-Stockholm-(Uppsala).  In May 2021 Hector Rail began operating the trains for FlixTrain when they launched their services in Sweden.

Locomotives

The company operates diesel and electrically powered locomotives:
 5 Class T66, ex GB Railfreight Class 66.
3 Class 141, ex ÖBB Class 1012 prototype locomotives (currently out of service due to poor reliablility)
 12 Class 142, ex ÖBB Class 1142 locomotives, 11 in operation
 8 Class 143, ex SJ Rc3 locomotives
 12 Class 241, Bombardier TRAXX locomotives
 8 Class 242, Siemens' ES64U2 EuroSprinter locomotives
20 Class 243, Siemens Vectron locomotives
 2 Class 441, Siemens' ES64F4 EuroSprinter locomotives
4 Class 841, NOHAB diesel locomotives ex SJ T43
 3 Class 921, diesel shunting locomotives ex SJ Z70
 2 Class 941, Vossloh G 2000 BB diesel locomotives
 2 Class 942, MaK 1205 diesel locomotives
The first digit indicates the number of different electrical voltages supported, but 8 for diesel-electric and 9 for diesel-hydraulic. The second digit is the number of axles, hinting the tractive effort.

Hector Rail previously owned 6 Class 161, ex NSB El 15 locomotives, but they were taken out of service in 2019 after deliveries of new Class 243 "Vectron" locomotives and were sold in 2020 to the Norwegian company Grenland Rail.

In Media
The railway was featured in a 2018 episode of Mighty Trains, showing newly-acquired Vectron locomotives hauling lumber from northern Sweden to the Ostrand pulp mill in Timrå, Sweden.

References

External links 

 Hector Rail
 Hoegh

Railway companies of Sweden
Companies based in Stockholm County